Michael Vincent may refer to:
Michael Vincent (magician) (born 1964), British magician
Michael Vincent (music journalist) (born 1976), Canadian music journalist, publisher, and composer
Jan-Michael Vincent (born 1944), American actor
Mike Vincent, Australian journalist

See also
Vincent (surname)